Cacao is a village in French Guiana, lying on the  to the south of Cayenne. Most of the population are Hmong farmers, refugees from Laos who were resettled in French Guiana in 1977. The reasoning was that living, and working conditions were similar to their native land. As of 2007, the village had a population of 750 people.

Overview

The village is four blocks in size, with narrow streets. Local commercial outlets include restaurants, grocery and bread stores. There are two primary schools, but no secondary education facilities. Public buildings include an insect museum, a library, a church, and gendarmerie.  There is also a Sunday morning market at which Hmong weaving, embroidery and food can be purchased. The main hotel in Cacao is L'Auberge des Orpailleurs. Tourist activities include jungle tours, canoeing and kayaking. During December the village hosts a Hmong New Year's festival that lasts about 3–4 days.

Economy
The economy is based on agriculture. The villagers have 1,375 hectares of land. A freshwater prawn farm has been setup and is exporting 1 to 1.2 tons to the United States and Puerto Rico every month. A sawmill employs 70 people.

Geography

Climate
Cacao has a tropical rainforest climate (Köppen climate classification Af).

References

Further reading
 BBC Article about the Hmong of Cacao
 New York Times: From a Hinterland, Hmong Forge a Home

External links
Cacao village via Facebook

Hmong diaspora
Laotian diaspora
Roura
Villages in French Guiana